Robert Lee Holden Jr. (born August 24, 1949) is an American politician. A member of the Democratic Party, he served as the 53rd Governor of Missouri from 2001 to 2005. Previously, he served as the State Treasurer of Missouri from 1993 to 2001 and represented the 136th district in the Missouri House of Representatives from 1983 to 1989. Since leaving public office, Holden has worked at Webster University, where he founded the Holden Public Policy Forum, and serves as the chairman and CEO of the United States Heartland China Association.

Early life
Even though he was born in Kansas City, Missouri on August 24, 1949, Holden was raised on a farm near Birch Tree. He attended a one-room school and earned his bachelor's degree in political science at Missouri State University (then known as Southwest Missouri State), where he was a member of the Alpha Phi Omega service fraternity. He also attended the John F. Kennedy School of Government at Harvard University, where he took courses specifically tailored for government executives. Holden met his wife Lori Hauser during his first campaign for the Missouri General Assembly and together, they have two boys, Robert and John D.

His brother, Calvin Ray Holden, is a Greene County Circuit Court judge.

Political career
From 1983 to 1989, Holden was a member of the Missouri House of Representatives. Holden served as State Treasurer from 1993 to 2001 and as governor from 2001 to 2005.

Governor of Missouri

In the 2000 election, Holden narrowly defeated Republican Congressman Jim Talent. Holden was inaugurated as governor in January 2001. His inauguration was the most elaborate and expensive in state history. The ceremony cost $1 million, of which $125,000 was paid from state government funds. Although Holden's inauguration ceremony received public financing equal to that of Missouri's previous two Governors, a perception that the inauguration was overly extravagant emerged and became a theme in opposition to his administration.

Holden was a member of the National Governors Association and was elected chair of the Midwestern Governors’ Conference which led the Midwestern states’ efforts to stimulate the economy by focusing on education and research. He also chaired the Governor's Ethanol Coalition and represented fellow governors on the National Medicaid Reform Task Force. Holden repeatedly defended Missouri's Medicaid program from cuts by the Republican legislature.

In 2001, Holden called a special session to create Missouri's Senior Rx Program. Holden was pro-gun, but due to some negative effects that he felt proposed legislation would have on Missouri gun owners, he vetoed a concealed-carry bill passed by the Missouri General Assembly. This was short-lived because his veto was overridden by both the Missouri House of Representatives and Senate and the concealed-carry bill passed into law in 2003.

Several Republican legislators who had initially voted against the bill, including Michael Gibbons of Kirkwood, switched sides to override Holden's veto. Holden favored greater spending on state elementary and secondary education. At one point in his term, he called the state legislature back into session after they had recessed for the year to ask for more state funding for education, but they refused additional monies. Holden served as a Chair of the Midwestern Governors Association in 2003.

Holden's term as governor ended on January 10, 2005.

2004 election
In 2004, as Holden sought re-election, he was challenged for the Democratic nomination for governor by a fellow Democrat, State Auditor Claire McCaskill. McCaskill successfully tapped into broad-based disgruntlement with Holden that prompted even some Democrats to call him by the unflattering moniker "OTB" (One Term Bob). After Holden's approval rating steadily dropped during the second half of his term, McCaskill defeated Holden in the Democratic primary, marking the first primary loss for a sitting governor in nearly two decades.

McCaskill lost the November 2 general election to Republican Secretary of State Matt Blunt.

Life after politics

Holden is currently the Chairman and CEO of the United States Heartland China Association, the United States Heartland China Association (USHCA) is a 501(c)3 bipartisan organization committed to building stronger ties between USHCA Region (20 states located in the USA between the Great Lakes to the Gulf) and the People’s Republic of China. Their focus is on Trust Building efforts connecting government officials; business leaders; educational and community interests with like-minded institutions between the Heartland Region and the People’s Republic of China.

Previously, Holden taught political science and communications courses at Webster University. Governor Holden is the founder and Director of the Holden Public Policy Forum at Webster University. The Forum describes itself as "a bi-partisan speakers series that will bring Governors, Senators, presidential candidates and private sector public policy leaders to St. Louis and the Webster University Old Post Office campus."

In 2016, Holden was appointed to the executive committee of Missouri's statewide NAACP chapter.

Holden endorsed and campaigned on behalf of Vice President Joe Biden in the Democratic primaries of the 2020 United States presidential election. Holden had previously endorsed Senator Hillary Clinton in the Democratic primaries of the 2008 presidential campaign and served as a Missouri Co-Chair and a member of the Clinton campaign's Education Policy Taskforce.

Electoral history
2004 Missouri Gubernatorial Election – Democratic Primary
Claire McCaskill (D), 52%
Bob Holden (D) (inc.), 45%
2000 Missouri Gubernatorial Election – General
Bob Holden (D), 49%
Jim Talent (R), 48%

References

External links

 

1949 births
Democratic Party governors of Missouri
Living people
Democratic Party members of the Missouri House of Representatives
State treasurers of Missouri
Missouri State University alumni
Harvard Kennedy School alumni
Webster University faculty